Paul John Fontana (November 27, 1911 – February 26, 1997) was a highly decorated United States Marine with the rank of major general. He was a flying ace with five aerial victories and a recipient of the Navy Cross during World War II.

Early life and career 
Paul J. Fontana was born on November 27, 1911, in Lucca, near Florence, Italy. He was raised in Sparks, Nevada, and graduated from the University of Nevada with a science degree.

Fontana commissioned into the Marine Corps as a second lieutenant on July 6, 1936, and was designated as a naval aviator in January 1940.

World War II 
When the United States entered World War II, Fontana was quickly promoted to major, and took command of the recently formed Marine Fighting Squadron 112 (VMF-112) in San Diego on May 11, 1942.

On October 15, Major Fontana's squadron set sail for New Caledonia. Major Fontana arrived at Henderson Field on Guadalcanal on November 2.

On November 11, Major Fontana led eight of his planes into battle against 22 Japanese bombers and six Zero escorts. The enemy was attempting to bomb Henderson Field, but Fontana shot one bomber down and led his squadron repelling the attack. He shot down two more enemy planes the following day that were attempting to attack American ships. A few days later, Major Fontana led six planes against twelve enemy fighters and succeeded in personally shooting two aircraft down. He was later awarded the Navy Cross for his actions during this period.

Major Fontana also led his squadron in strafing attacks on Japanese destroyers off Guadalcanal. He was relieved of his command by Captain Robert B. Fraser on March 27, 1943. He was later assigned to the Tenth Army and took part in the battle of Okinawa.

Korean War 
Lieutenant Colonel Fontana would later take part in the Korean War as the commanding officer of Marine Aircraft Group 33. On September 21, 1950, he led a close air support mission against enemy positions near Seoul. Fontana personally made several low level attacks under heavy anti-aircraft fire and aided in destroying the enemy strongpoint. For his actions, he was awarded the Silver Star. He was also awarded the Legion of Merit for his service during the Chosin Reservoir campaign.

Later career and life 
Fontana would later be promoted to major general and was made the commanding general of the 2nd Marine Aircraft Wing at Marine Corps Air Station Cherry Point. In addition, he commanded the 1st Marine Aircraft Wing from 1964 to 1965 during the Vietnam War, where he was awarded two Legions of Merit. Major General Fontana retired from the Marine Corps on June 30, 1973.

Retiring in New Bern, North Carolina with his wife, Paul J. Fontana would later die there on February 26, 1997. He was buried in Arlington National Cemetery with his wives Claire R. (1912–1954) and Beth G. (1915–2000).

See also 
 List of 1st Marine Aircraft Wing commanders

References

External links
Oral history interview with MajGen Paul J. Fontana from East Carolina University

1911 births
1997 deaths
United States Marine Corps personnel of World War II
United States Marine Corps personnel of the Korean War
United States Marine Corps personnel of the Vietnam War
American World War II flying aces
American Korean War pilots
Aviators from Nevada
People from Sparks, Nevada
Recipients of the Navy Cross (United States)
Recipients of the Silver Star
Recipients of the Legion of Merit
Recipients of the Distinguished Flying Cross (United States)
Recipients of the Air Medal
United States Marine Corps generals
United States Marine Corps pilots of World War II
United States Naval Aviators
Burials at Arlington National Cemetery
Italian emigrants to the United States